Salça is a category of thick, deep red paste made from peppers or tomato and salt, originating in Turkey.

Varieties

Biber salçası 
Biber salçası (literally "pepper paste"; also called kırmızı biber salçası, literally "red pepper paste") is made from red chili peppers or sweet long peppers and salt. The peppers' stems and seeds are removed, and then the pepper is crushed and salt added. 
The crushed peppers are sun-dried for six to seven days (depending on the strength of the sun) until the mixture develops intense sun-dried flavor and a pasty consistency. 
It is a part of the cuisine of Anatolia and is enjoyed by different ethnic groups in the region.  It is used mainly for flavoring main dishes, as well as to fill pide and börek. Another common use is as a spread, typically on bread or crackers.

There are two main varieties of biber salçası:
 Acı biber salçası (literally "hot pepper paste"), made from red hot chili peppers
 Tatlı biber salçası (literally "sweet pepper paste"), made from sweet red peppers

Domates salçası 
Domates salçası is tomato paste made from concentrated pureed in season tomatoes either over heat or under the sun during the late summer months. 

Traditional methods of making homemade Turkish tomato paste include grinding or pureeing peeled tomatoes, removing the seeds with a Turkish colander called a süzgeç and then mixing with salt. The paste is then reduced under the sun over three to four days. The paste must be stirred frequently when sun-drying to prevent spoiling. Some people reduce the puree over an open fire to speed up the process. 

Commercial types of tomato salça are cooked in large factories rather than sun dried and do not have the same intense flavour or colour.

See also

 Ajika, a dip in Caucasian cuisine, based on a boiled preparation of hot red peppers, garlic, herbs and spices
 Ajvar, a relish made principally from red bell peppers, with garlic
 Chili sauce and paste
 Muhammara or acuka, a hot pepper dip in Levantine cuisine
 List of dips
 List of condiments
 List of sauces
 List of spreads

References

Chili paste
Food paste
Spreads (food)
Tomato products
Turkish words and phrases
Turkish condiments